Tkay is the debut studio album by Australian singer and rapper Tkay Maidza. It was released on 28 October 2016 by Downtown and Interscope Records. The lead single from the album, entitled "Carry On", was released on 30 August 2016, featuring rapper and songwriter Killer Mike.

Background
The concept for the album began in 2014, around the time Maidza was working on her debut extended play, entitled Switch Tapes. The EP was released in October 2014, through Dew Process Records.

In December 2014, Maidza announced that she was working on her debut studio album. She was then signed to Universal Music Australia and launched her official Vevo channel on YouTube. She later announced that she decided to scrap most of it because it did not go to plan. In December 2015, she was featured on Troye Sivan's song "DKLA". The song was released on his third extended play, entitled Wild, in September 2015 and later featured on his debut studio album Blue Neighbourhood, which was released in December 2015. Maidza was featured on the album alongside other artists, including Broods and Betty Who.

In 2016, Maidza gained greater international notice when she collaborated with DJ and record producer Martin Solveig on his single "Do It Right".

It then sparked Maidza's lead single from the album, "Carry On", which features vocals from rapper Killer Mike, and was said to have been inspired from one of Sivan's debut album collaborators Dann Hume, who previously co-wrote and produced the song "The Quiet".

In the beginning of October 2016, the album's first promotional single was released, entitled "Tennies". Two weeks after, the album's second official single, entitled "Simulation", was released on 16 October 2016. The song was revealed to have been co-written with rising electronic musician George Maple, who previously co-wrote and co-produced Maidza's song "Ghost".

The album was eventually released in the Americas and Australia. She also announced that European version the album has been delayed and will eventually be released in January 2017. In December, the song "Tennies" was used to promote the new iWatch in partnership with Nike in their new advertisement which was premiered in early December 2016.

The album was also released in the UK and Europe at the later date of 20 January 2017.

Track listing

Charts

References

2016 debut albums
Tkay Maidza albums
Downtown Records albums
Interscope Records albums